Berghers Hill is a hamlet in Wooburn civil parish in Buckinghamshire, England.

References

Hamlets in Buckinghamshire
Wycombe District